Overton High School (currently known as Watkins Overton High School) is a secondary school for the Creative and Performing Arts located in Memphis, Tennessee.

The school, which serves grades 9 through 12, is a part of the Shelby County Schools district. It was a Memphis City School when it was built in 1959. It became Shelby County School, when Memphis surrender their charter back in 2014.

The School was named in honor of Memphis mayor S. Watkins Overton.

Athletics
Overton's sports programs include:
Boys sports: Basketball, Baseball, Bowling, Cross Country, Football, Golf, Soccer, Tennis, and Track.
Girls sports: Basketball, volleyball, Bowling, Cheerleading, Cross Country, Golf, Pom Pom, Soccer, Softball, Tennis, and Track.

Fine arts

Overton was declared a performing arts high school in 1976. The late Dr. Lulah M. Hedgeman was selected as choir director in 1976 and within five years, grew the program from 25 students to a choir of 150 students. The choir, under Hedgeman, performed a full concert in 1988 at Carnegie Hall in New York City. The choirs were invited to Nice, France, four times as guests of the city. Hedgeman was honored by the Walt Disney company in 1990 in their first production of The Salute to the American Teacher Awards. The Overton Choirs program, under the direction of Hedgeman, were ranked number 1 in the state of Tennessee for 21 consecutive years until Hedgeman's death in December 1997. The Vocal Music Department at Overton is still ranked the number 1 performing arts high school choir in the city of Memphis as of April 2016. The band is the 2008 Division AAA Champions of the University of Memphis Bandmasters Championship and the 2008 Smoky Mountains Invitational Champions.

Other aspects of the CAPA program include Creative Writing, choirs, orchestra, jazz ensembles, drama, dance, and visual arts. Students must audition to qualify for CAPA programs.

Creative Writing, run by Shannon Marszalek, frequently hosts Poetry Slams.  The Poetry Out Loud competition was held on Saturday, February 4, 2012.  Many of the Scholastic Gold Keys come from both the Creative Writing Department and the Art Department.

Notable alumni
O'landa Draper - Singer, choir director
Sergio Kerusch - American professional basketball player
K. Michelle - Singer, actress
Wendy Moten - Singer
Johnny Neumann - American basketball player and coach
Kevin Paige - singer
Josey Scott - lead singer of Saliva
Derrick Townsel - former gridiron football wide receiver
Elise Neal - Actress

References

External links
 Overton High School

Overton
Schools in Memphis, Tennessee